Wilhelmine Catharina Alma Wartenberg (born Stähr; * 22 December 1871 in Ottensen; died 25 December 1928 in Altona) was a member of the Social Democratic Party of Germany und Women's Rights Activists.

Life
Alma Wartenberg was born into a social democratic working class family with twelve children. She worked as a housemaid until she married the locksmith Ferdinand Wartenberg. They had four children

In Hamburg-Ottensen was crucially engaged in forming the proletarian women's movement. 1902 to 1906 she was elected every year on women's congresses as a social democratic delegate for the constituency Ottensen/Pinneberg. Asagitator amongst working women, Wartenberg toured through the North-German state of Schleswig-Holstein and participated in women's conferences and party conventions as a delegate. 1905 she initiated with others a campaign against the judgement of the Altona court to release four young and middle class men after they had been found guilty of the rape of a housemaid. During and after the campaign, Wartenberg supported a collaboration with the so-called "Radicals" of the middle class women's movement. This contradicted the official party policy and brought her in conflict with the party leadership. A procedure to expel her from the party was stopped. However, she was nonetheless forced to put down her responsibilities as a delegate.

Being denied to continue working as a delegate for the party, Wartenberg took action especially for maternity protection, birth control and sexual education. High infant mortality rate, widespread „women's suffering“ due to many births, miscarriages and a large number of illegal abortions, lack of information to sexual issues and missing government support had alarmed her. Again, she toured the country, this time with pictured slide shows, to educate about female anatomy, contraception and mother protection. Her shows drew hundreds of listeners. After her show she publicly sold contraception, even though the "sale or transmission of hygienic rubber articles" was liable to prosecution in the  German Empire. With this she didn't only antagonize the Empire's judiciary but also the association of doctors and especially ecclesiastic circles. Repeatedly she was prosecuted for „offense of public nuisance“. However, she insisted on every woman's right to decide over her body and number of births alone.

Again in contradiction with official party policy, Wartenberg supported the idea of a „birthing strike“ that was controversially discussed within social democracy as a protest against the compulsion to give birth propagated by the state.

In 1919, Alma Wartenberg became the SPD's delegate in the Altona Stadtverordnetenkollegium. In 1925 she was elected as the sole female member of the Landtag Schleswig-Holstein gewählt.

After a stroke she stepped back from all her responsibilities in 1927 and died in the following year.

Honours 

In 1997, a public place was named after Alma Wartenberg.

Further reading 
 Inge Döll-Krämer: "Alma Wartenberg – sozialdemokratische „Vertrauensperson“ in Ottensen", in:  Aufgeweckt. Frauenalltag in vier Jahrhunderten. Ein Lesebuch. ergebnisse Verlag, Hamburg 1988, S. 182–194.
 Heike Haarhoff: "Späte Straßen-(Um)Taufe. Der neue Alma-Wartenberg-Platz wird heute gefeiert", in: taz (8. März 1997), Hamburg Spezial 66, S. 42.
 Robert Jütte: Lust ohne Last. Geschichte der Empfängnisverhütung. Beck, München 2003, S. 257.
 Gisela Notz (Hrsg.): Kalender 2005. Wegbereiterinnen III (PDF; 952 kB). Bonn: Friedrich-Ebert-Stiftung 2004, Kalenderblatt für Oktober.
 Rita Bake: Wer steckt dahinter? Nach Frauen benannte Straßen, Plätze und Brücken in Hamburg. Landeszentrale für politische Bildung, Hamburg 2005 (4. Auflage), S. 20f.
 "Wer war eigentlich ...? Alma Wartenberg (1871–1928)", in: Ottenser – das unabhängige Stadtteilmagazin 01 (Mai/Juni 2006) (PDF; 4,0 MB), S. 13.
 Bodo Schümann: "Wartenberg, Wilhelmine Catharina Alma". In: Franklin Kopitzsch, Dirk Brietzke. Hamburgische Biografie, Personen-Lexikon. Wallstein, Göttingen 2012, S. 359–361.

External links 

Biografie Wartenbergs auf der Seite des Stadtteilarchivs Ottensen

1871 births
1928 deaths
Social Democratic Party of Germany politicians
German activists
German women activists